The International Day of Action for Women's Health is an international observance celebrated on May 28 every year since 1987.

See also
 International Day for the Elimination of Violence against Women
 International Women's Day
 Menstrual Hygiene Day (May 28)

References

External links
 May 28 | International Day of Action for Women's Health
 Campaigns | WGNRR

Feminism and health
May observances

Civil awareness days
Recurring events established in 1987
Women's events